David Liu may refer to:
 Chung Laung Liu (1934–2020), also known as David Liu, Chinese-born Taiwanese computer scientist
 David Liu (figure skater) (born 1965), Taiwanese figure skater
 David R. Liu (born 1973), American chemist
 David Liu, founder of Jiepang